Senator Clinton may refer to:
 Hillary Clinton (born 1947), U.S. Senator from New York 2001–2009; also Secretary of State (2009–2013), First Lady (1993–2001), and 2016 Democratic Party nominee for President 
 DeWitt Clinton (1769–1828), U.S. Senator from New York 1802–1803; also Mayor of New York City (1803–1807, 1808–1810, 1811–1815) and Governor of New York (1817–1822, 1825–1828)
 George Henry Clinton, Louisiana State Senator 1908–1924

See also
 Clinton (surname) for others